Sadko is the principal character in a Russian medieval epic bylina. He was an adventurer, merchant, and gusli musician from Novgorod.

Textual notes 

"Sadko" is a version of the tale translated by Arthur Ransome in Old Peter's Russian tales (1916). Kate Blakey's translation of a variant, "Sadko, the Rich Merchant Guest", appeared in the Slavonic Review (1924).

A bylina version collected by P. N. Rybnikov has been translated by James Bailey.

Synopsis
Sadko of Novgorod played the gusli on the shores of a lake and river. The Tsar of the Sea enjoyed his music, and offered to help him. Sadko was instructed to make a bet with the local merchants about catching a gold-finned fish in the lake; when he caught it (as provided by the Sea Tsar), the merchants had to pay the wager, making Sadko a rich merchant.

Sadko traded on the seas with his new wealth, but did not pay proper respects to the Tsar as per their agreement.  The Tsar stopped Sadko's ships in the sea.  He and his sailors tried to appease the Sea Tsar with gold, to no avail. Sadko realizes a sacrifice of a live soul was being demanded. All the shipmates drew lots, but Sadko draws the unlucky lot as if by fate or magic, so he is sent overboard and he sinks into the sea.

In the sea world, Sadko played the gusli for the Sea Tsar, whose dancing roughened the seas, so that all the sailors prayed to Mikola Mozhaisky (Mikula Mozhaysk, patron of mariners; or the name Saint Nicholas is called by in variants), and the saint instructed Sadko to quit playing, and break the strings if the Tsar will not let him stop. As the Tsar was bound to offer him a choice of maidens to wed in order to detain him, Mikola advised him to choose the last one, with the warning not to embrace her as a wife (consummate the marriage) if he hoped ever to return to Russia. The Tsar showed Sadko a selection of 900 (or 300) maidens, and Sadko picked out Chernava (diminutive: Chernavushka) who appeared last. The two then wed, but the groom made no overture to the bride on their wedding night, and Sadko the next day woke up in his hometown, reunited with his terrestrial wife.
 
The Chernava is explained as the nymph of the River Chernava. In Ransom's version, the Sea Tsar's youngest daughter is named Volkhov, which is the river Sadko has always cherished.

Analysis

Tale type
The story of Sadko is classified in the international Aarne-Thompson-Uther Index as tale type ATU 677*, "Below the Sea": due to his musical prowess, the hero is taken to the court of an underwater king.

Motifs
In some variants, Sadko is chosen to jump overboard by throwing lots between the men. This motif, derived from the Biblical story of Jonah, is a widespread device, appearing, for instance, in Child ballad 57 Brown Robyn's Confession.<ref>{{cite book|first = Child|last = Francis James|title = The English and Scottish Popular Ballads|volume = V. 2|page = 15|location = New York|publisher = Dover Publications|year = 1965}}</ref>

Historical parallels

Sadko may be based on a certain  Sotko Sytinich (or Sedko Sitinits), who is mentioned in the Novgorodian First Chronicle as the patron of the stone Church of Boris and Gleb built in the Novgorodian Detinets in 1167.

Sadko can also be viewed as a metaphor for Yaroslav the Wise. The liberation of the Novgorodian people by Sadko can also be linked to the establishment of the Novgorod Republic by Yaroslav.

Adaptations
This tale attracted the attention of several authors in the 19th century with the rise of the Slavophile movement and served as a basis for a number of derived works, most notably the poem "Sadko" by Alexei Tolstoy (written 1871–1872); additionally notable the 1898 opera entitled Садко (Sadko) composed by Nikolai Rimsky-Korsakov, who also wrote the Libretto. In 1952, Aleksandr Ptushko directed a live action film based on the opera entitled Садко (Sadko).  A shortened and heavily modified version of this film was dubbed and entitled The Magic Voyage of Sinbad in 1962; later spoofed on Mystery Science Theater 3000 and released on DVD by Shout! Factory in 2011. In 2018 an animated adaption was released.
The 1953 Soviet biopic Rimsky-Korsakov features pieces of the opera.

The 1952 original film adaption Садко by киностудии МОСФИЛЬМ (movie maker MOSFILM) was released on DVD in February 2004 by the Russian Cinema Council (Ruscico) as noted on Mosfilm website  and available as free download on RareLust website  as Sadko.

See also
 Sadko (musical tableau)
 Sadko (opera)
 Jūratė and Kastytis - a similar Lithuanian legend.

Explanatory notes

References
Citations

Bibliography

 

 

 

External links

 Sadko the bylina Prose version
 Sadko as collected by Arthur Ransome in Old Peter's Russian Tales Sadko as collected by Arthur Ransome in Old Peter's Russian Tales'' as a librivox.org audiobook.
 Collection of bylin about Sadko (in Russian)

Russian folklore characters
Characters in Bylina
People from medieval Novgorod
Russian folklore
Epic poems
Russian poems
Medieval legends
Maritime folklore
Slavic folklore characters
Veliky Novgorod
Legendary Russian people
Russian legends